Stuart Bradie (born 27 August 1966) is a Scottish businessman and the current CEO of KBR.

Education 
Bradie has a Bachelor of Science degree in mechanical engineering from Aberdeen University and a Master of Business Administration from the Edinburgh Business School, Heriot-Watt University. In addition, Bradie earned the INSEAD Certificate in Corporate Governance.

Career 
Bradie serves as KBR's president and chief executive officer. He assumed this role when he joined KBR on 2 June 2014. Bradie also serves as an executive member of KBR's Board of directors; he was appointed on 2 July 2014. With over 30 years of industry experience, Bradie leads KBR from its global headquarters in Houston, Texas, and the UK office in Leatherhead.

Bradie joined KBR from WorleyParsons Ltd., where he held the position of group managing director – operations and delivery. In that role, he led the group's global operations across more than 40 countries in the hydrocarbons, mining, chemicals, power, and infrastructure sectors. Bradie joined WorleyParsons in 2001 and was previously managing director across Europe, Africa, Asia, and the Middle East.

Prior to joining WorleyParsons, Bradie held managing director and country manager roles with PT Kvaerner Indonesia and Kvaerner Philippines.

Compensation 
As KBR's chief executive, Bradie earned $9,864,381 in 2020.

Awards 
On 14 February 2019, Bradie was appointed to the National Safety Council's influential 2019 list of "CEOs Who 'Get It".

References

1966 births
Living people
People from Irvine, North Ayrshire
Scottish businesspeople
Alumni of the University of Aberdeen
Alumni of Heriot-Watt University
INSEAD alumni